Kajvan may refer to:
 Kajvan, East Azerbaijan
 Kajvan, Razavi Khorasan